Real field may refer to:
 Real numbers, the numbers that can be represented by infinite decimals
 Formally real field, an algebraic field that has the so-called "real" property
 Real closed field
 Real quadratic field